The 20th Bangladesh National Film Awards, presented by Ministry of Information, Bangladesh to felicitate the best of Bangladeshi Cinema released in the year 1995. The ceremony took place in Dhaka and awards were given by then President of Bangladesh. The National Film Awards are the only film awards given by the government itself. Every year, a national panel appointed by the government selects the winning entry, and the award ceremony is held in Dhaka. 1995 was the 20th ceremony of National Film Awards.

List of winners
This year artists received awards in 16 categories. No awards were given in Best Music Director, and Best Lyrics categories in 1995.

Merit Awards

Technical Awards

See also
Meril Prothom Alo Awards
Ifad Film Club Award
Babisas Award

References

External links

National Film Awards (Bangladesh) ceremonies
1995 film awards
1996 awards in Bangladesh
1996 in Dhaka